In computational geometry, the largest empty sphere problem is the problem of finding a hypersphere of largest radius  in d-dimensional space whose interior does not overlap with any given obstacles.

Two dimensions 
The largest empty circle problem is the problem of finding a circle of largest radius in the plane whose interior does not overlap with any given obstacles.

A common special case is as follows. Given n points in the plane, find a largest circle centered within their convex hull and enclosing none of them. The problem may be solved using Voronoi diagrams in  optimal time .

See also
Bounding sphere
Farthest-first traversal
Largest empty rectangle

References

Geometric algorithms